The Real Dirt on Farmer John is a 2005 documentary film directed by Taggart Siegel about the life of Midwestern farmer John Peterson, operator of Angelic Organics. It tells the history of the eccentric farmer's family farm in rural Caledonia, Illinois.

Awards
The Real Dirt on Farmer John won 31 awards at film festivals. This includes the first ever Reel Current Al Gore Award at the Nashville Film Festival, the Audience Award at the Chicago International Documentary Festival, the Grand Jury Award at the San Francisco International Film Festival, the Audience Award at the Slamdance Film Festival and the Italian Environmental Film Festival.

References

External links
 Angelic Organics website
 
 
 The Real Dirt on Farmer John site for Independent Lens on PBS

Documentary films about agriculture in the United States
American documentary films
Boone County, Illinois
2005 films
2005 documentary films
Films directed by Taggart Siegel
Films scored by Mark Orton
2000s English-language films
2000s American films